Streptomyces swartbergensis is a bacterium species from the genus of Streptomyces which has been isolated from soil from banks of the Gamka River from the Cape Province in South Africa. Streptomyces swartbergensis produces antibiotics.

See also 
 List of Streptomyces species

References 

swartbergensis
Bacteria described in 2018